Siren or sirens may refer to:

Common meanings
 Siren (alarm), a loud acoustic alarm used to alert people to emergencies
 Siren (mythology), an enchanting but dangerous monster in Greek mythology

Places
 Siren (town), Wisconsin
 Siren, Wisconsin, a village
 Siren Bay, Victoria Land, Antarctica
 Siren Rock, Ellsworth Land, Antarctica

People
 Siren (surname)
 Siren, stage name of female bodybuilder Shelley Beattie on the TV show American Gladiators
 Siren, stage name of Valerie Waugaman on the 2008 revival of American Gladiators
 Alexander Brandon (born 1974), American musician, known as "Siren" in the demoscene
 Siren Sundby (born 1982), Norwegian Olympic sailor

Animals 
 Siren (genus), a genus of aquatic salamanders in the family Sirenidae
 Hestina, a genus of brush-footed butterfly commonly called sirens
 Sirenia, an order of aquatic mammals including dugongs and manatees
 Sirenidae, a family of aquatic salamanders

Arts, entertainment, and media

Fictional characters
 Siren (DC Comics), the name of two DC Comics characters
 Siren (Transformers), a character from The Transformers: Headmasters
 Siren, a character in Ice Age: Continental Drift
 Siren, a minor character in Passions
 Sirens, video game characters in Borderlands
The Siren, a character from the 1960s Batman TV series unrelated to the DC Comics Siren
 Siren (Malibu Comics), a character from Malibu Comics' Ultraverse imprint

Films 
 The Siren (1917 film), a lost Fox film starring Valeska Suratt
 The Siren (1927 film), an American melodrama directed by Byron Haskin
 Siren (1968 film), a Belgian animated short film
 Sirens (1994 film), starring Hugh Grant, directed by John Duigan
 Sirens (1999 film), starring Dana Delany
 Siren (2010 film), a horror film starring Eoin Macken
 Siren (2013 film), starring Vinessa Shaw
 Siren (2016 film), a 2016 horror film

Games
 Siren (video game series)
 Siren (video game), 2003

Literature
 Siren (play), a 1990 play by David Williamson
 Siren, a book by Tara Moss
 "Sirens" (Ulysses episode) an episode in James Joyce's novel Ulysses
 “The Siren”, a novel by Kiera Cass

Music

Groups
 Sirens (American band), metalcore band from Terre Haute, Indiana
 Sirens (British band), a Newcastle upon Tyne based girl group
 Siren, a rock band featuring Kevin Coyne

Albums 
 Siren (Roxy Music album), 1975
 Siren (Heather Nova album), 1998
 Siren (Susumu Hirasawa album), 1996
 Sirens (Kenneth Newby album), 1997
 Sirens (Savatage album), 1983
 Sirens (On the Might of Princes album), 2003
 Sirens (Astarte album), 2004
 Sirens (It Dies Today album), 2006
 Sirens (S. J. Tucker album), 2006
 Sirens (Nine Black Alps album), 2012
 Sirens (May Jailer album)
 Sirens (Gorgon City album), 2014
 Sirens (The Weepies album), 2015
 Sirens (Woodlock EP), 2015
 Sirens, by Ben Abraham, 2016
 Sirens (Sublime with Rome album)
 Sirens (Nicolas Jaar album), 2016

Songs  
 "Siren" (Malcolm Lincoln song)
 "Siren" (Asian Kung-Fu Generation song), 2004
 "Siren" (Ruby Gloom song), 2008
 "Siren" (Paces song), 2018
 "Siren (Never Let You Go)", by the Divinyls, 1983
 "Siren" (Sunmi song), 2018
 "Siren", by Tori Amos on the soundtrack on the 1998 film Great Expectations
 "Siren", by Theater of Tragedy on the 1998 album Aégis
 "Sirens" (Jeff Lynne song), 1990
 "Sirens" (Dizzie Rascal song), 2007
 "Sirens" (Pearl Jam song), 2013
 "Sirens" (Cher Lloyd song), for her album Sorry I'm Late
 "Sirens", by Angels & Airwaves on the 2007 album I-Empire
 "Sirens", by Candiria on the 2008 album Kiss the Lie
 "Sirens", by Coroner on the 1991 album Mental Vortex
 "Sirens", by Markus Feehily on the 2015 album Fire
 "Sirens", by Kelsea Ballerini on the 2015 album The First Time
 "Sirens", the title track on the album Sirens by Savatage
 "Sirens", by The String Cheese Incident on the album Untying the Not
 "Sirens", 2012 song by Nell Bryden, also covered by Cher for the album Closer to the Truth
 "Sirens", 2001 song by Tim Deluxe
 "Sirens", 2022 song by Flume
 "Sirens", 2022 song by Imagine Dragons on the 2022 album Mercury – Acts 1 & 2
 "The Siren" (song), by Nightwish
 "The Siren", by Graveyard on the 2011 album Hisingen Blues
 "The Siren", a song on the album A Violent Emotion by Aesthetic Perfection
 "The Sirens", song by George and Ira Gershwin from A Dangerous Maid 1921

Other uses in music
 Acme Siren, a varying-pitch wind instrument, often found in the percussion section of orchestras
 Sirènes ("Sirens"), a movement in the Debussy suite Nocturnes
The Sirens, Op. 33, by Reinhold Glière (1875-1956)

Paintings
 The Siren (Waterhouse painting), a 1900 painting by John William Waterhouse
The Siren, 1888 painting by Edward Armitage

Sculptures
 Siren (statue), a 2008 life-size statue by Marc Quinn
 The Siren (sculpture), a 2005 sculpture by Norman J. Gitzen
 Siren (bronze sculpture), Roman bronze sculpture ca. 1571–90
 The Sirens (sculpture), an 1887 bronze sculpture by Auguste Rodin
 Tritón y Sirena, a sculpture in Puerto Vallarta, Jalisco, Mexico

Television

Series
 Sirens (1993 TV series), an American crime drama series
 Sirens (2002 TV serial), a two-part British serial
 Sirens (2011 TV series), a British television programme broadcast on Channel 4
 Sirens (2014 TV series), an American comedy program based on the Channel 4 series
 Supermodel Me: Sirens, the fifth season of Asian's reality program Supermodel Me
 Siren (TV series), a 2018 American fantasy drama series

Episodes
 "Siren" (Millennium), television series episode
 "Sirens", an episode of Aqua Teen Hunger Force
 "The Siren", an episode of Mako: Island of Secrets

Other arts, entertainment, and media
 Company of Sirens, a Canadian feminist theatre company
 Siren (magazine), a bimonthly Canadian magazine
 Siren FM, a community radio station based at the University of Lincoln in the United Kingdom
 Siren Music Festival, an annual outdoor concert held at Coney Island, New York, from 2001 to 2010
 The Siren (musical), a 1911 Broadway musical

Court cases
 The Siren - see List of United States Supreme Court cases, volume 74
 The Siren - see List of United States Supreme Court cases, volume 80

Military 
 , several Royal Navy ships
 SS-N-9 Siren, NATO reporting name for the P-120 Malakhit, a Russian anti-ship missile
 , several US Navy ships

Sports
 Sacramento Sirens, a woman's football team
 Saskatoon Sirens, an expansion team in the Legends Football League
 Sirens A.S.C., a waterpolo club in Malta
 Sirens F.C., a football club in Malta
 Sirens Stadium, the club's home ground
 Strathclyde Sirens, a Scottish netball team

Other uses 
 Siren (codec), an audio codec
 Siren (fragrance), a perfume endorsed by Paris Hilton
 SIREN code, a nine-digit number given to all French businesses
 Siren Visual, an Australian-based DVD distribution company
 SIREN, an open energy system model developed for Western Australia
 Standard siren, a unit of gravitational waves

See also
 
 
 Siran (disambiguation)
 Sirena (disambiguation)
 Sirene (disambiguation)
 Syreen, an alien race in the computer game series Star Control
 Syren (disambiguation)